Tony Martinez (January 27, 1920 – September 16, 2002) was an American film, television and theatre actor. He was perhaps best known for playing "Pepino" in the American situation comedy television series The Real McCoys.

Life and career 
Martinez was born in San Juan, Puerto Rico. He first studied in music, in which Martinez later moved to New York City, studying at the Juilliard School. He played five instruments, later having his own musical ensemble that was called "Tony Martinez and His Mambo" in New York City. After that, Martinez had later studied about acting at the Pasadena Playhouse.

Martinez later began his film and television career, earning some small roles, when he was studying at the Pasadena Playhouse. In 1956, he and his musical ensemble appeared in the film Rock Around the Clock. Martinez then later won the role of Pepino in the new ABC situation comedy television series The Real McCoys, in which he played the role as the hired Mexican farmworker. He won the role as he was discovered by the creator Irving Pincus and producer Norman Pincus, while Martinez was just with his musical ensemble performing in the Sunset Strip.

In his theatre career, Martinez had appeared in over 2,245 performances in the Broadway play Man of La Mancha. He played Sancho Panza. After The Real McCoys ended in 1963, Martinez guest-starred in a few television programs including The Man from U.N.C.L.E., F Troop, My Favorite Martian, Accidental Family and Storefront Lawyers. He then wrote music for numerous films in Mexico. Martinez retired his career in 2000, in which he last appeared in the cable network The Nashville Network.

Death 
Martinez died in September 2002 of natural causes in Las Vegas, Nevada, at the age of 82.

References

External links 

Rotten Tomatoes profile

1920 births
2002 deaths
Male actors from San Juan, Puerto Rico
Puerto Rican emigrants
American people of Puerto Rican descent
American male film actors
American male television actors
American male stage actors
American bandleaders
20th-century American male actors
20th-century Puerto Rican male actors
Juilliard School alumni